The 1985–86 Dallas Sidekicks season was the second season of the Dallas Sidekicks indoor soccer club. It saw the team move to the Eastern Division and make the playoffs for the first time in franchise in history.

Roster

Schedule and results

Pre-season

Regular season

Postseason

Final standings

y – division champions, x – clinched playoff berth

External links
 1985-86 Dallas Sidekicks season stats at Kicks Fan fansite

Dallas Sidekicks (1984–2004) seasons
Dallas Sidekicks
Dallas Sidekicks